The jet antbird (Cercomacra nigricans) is a species of bird in the family Thamnophilidae. It is found in Colombia, Venezuela, Panama and western Ecuador. Its natural habitat is subtropical or tropical moist lowland forests.

The jet antbird was described by the English zoologist Philip Sclater in 1858 and given its current binomial name Cercomacra nigricans.

References

jet antbird
Birds of Colombia
Birds of Ecuador
Birds of Panama
Birds of Venezuela
jet antbird
jet antbird
Taxonomy articles created by Polbot